Guilty Conscience is a 1985 American television film, produced by Robert A. Papazian, written by Richard Levinson and William Link, directed by David Greene, starring Anthony Hopkins, Blythe Danner and Swoosie Kurtz. The film score was composed by Billy Goldenberg. It premiered on April 2, 1985 on CBS.

Plot
Arthur Jamison (Anthony Hopkins), a wealthy criminal defence attorney, is facing a costly divorce from his wife, Louise (Blythe Danner).  Arthur deals with the predicament by imagining numerous schemes in which he kills her.  As a defense attorney, Arthur is familiar with both the courts and the minds of criminals, and he spends much of the film consulting an officious imaginary version of himself (a double played by Donegan Smith) for the perfect scheme to rid himself of Louise.  Arthur runs each murder, or the subsequent trial, through in his mind, searching for problems, loopholes, and the elusive watertight alibi.

Arthur's mistress, Jackie Willis (Swoosie Kurtz), meets up with Louise in secret. The two concoct a scheme to kill Arthur. They confront Arthur at gunpoint, planning to stage his murder as a suicide.  Unfazed, Arthur takes control of the situation, pointing out the flaws in what was supposed to be their foolproof scheme. For one thing, Arthur tells them he has been cheating on both of them with a third woman and was about to go out on a highly anticipated date with her, so was not of a mindset to commit suicide.

Furthermore, Arthur reveals that he had been recording the entire confrontation with Louise and Jackie. He uses the tape to attempt to blackmail Louise, but, enraged by the implosion of her plan, she chases her husband with a gun. A brief struggle ensues, and Louise is shot dead. Now, however, Louise's accidental death implicates Arthur for having murdered her.  Arthur had only been bluffing about the tape, there is no evidence that the shooting was an accident other than the word of Jackie, his mistress, who may not be willing to testify to exonerate him. Arthur imagines himself in court, his imaginary self now his own prosecutor, and how the case will unfold.

At this point the film shows Arthur back at home, again poking holes in the scheme. It is revealed to be yet another of his unrealized, purely imaginary plans.

Louise arrives home, shoots him dead, and phones Jackie to inform her the deed is done.  The film ends with Louise rearranging the living room to cover up evidence of the murder.

External links

1985 films
1985 television films
Films directed by David Greene
Films scored by Billy Goldenberg
Adultery in films
Films about divorce
Films about lawyers
Films about murder
Mariticide in fiction
Uxoricide in fiction